Virgin Express served the following destinations before merging:

At time of closure
 Belgium
 Brussels Airport Hub
 Denmark
 Copenhagen Airport
 France
 Marseille Provence Airport
 Nice - Côte d'Azur Airport
 Germany
 Berlin Schönefeld Airport
 Hamburg Airport
 Munich Airport
 Greece
 Athens International Airport
 Italy
 Bari Airport
 Catania-Fontanarossa Airport
 Milan/Bergamo - Orio al Serio Airport
 Naples Airport
 Palermo Airport
 Rome - Leonardo da Vinci Airport
 Portugal
 Faro - Faro Airport
 Lisbon - Portela Airport
 Spain
 Barcelona - El Prat Airport
 Girona - Girona - Costa Brava Airport
 Madrid - Barajas Airport
 Málaga Airport
 Murcia-San Javier Airport
 Palma de Mallorca - Son Sant Joan Airport
 Valencia - Valencia Airport
 Switzerland
 Geneva - Cointrin Airport

Prior to closure
Destinations prior to closure include:
 France
 Toulon
 Republic of Ireland
 Shannon (Shannon Airport) 
 Italy
 Milan - Linate Airport (Services moved to Orio al Serio in Bergamo)
 Netherlands
 Amsterdam - Schiphol Airport
 Rotterdam Airport
 Sweden
 Göteborg Landvetter Airport
 Stockholm-Arlanda Airport
 United Kingdom
 London
 London Gatwick Airport
 London Heathrow Airport
 London Stansted Airport

External links 
Brussels Airlines

References 

Lists of airline destinations

sr:Редовне линије изиЏета